John Waddington is an English musician known as the guitarist for the English electronic rock group The Pop Group.

Biography
John Waddington was seventeen years old when he started his first band, serving as vocalist, guitarist, and principal songwriter for the punk group The Boyfriends. The band was short-lived and he joined The Pop Group in 1977, serving as one of their guitarists. He performed on their two albums, Y and For How Much Longer Do We Tolerate Mass Murder?, which were critically acclaimed. After The Pop Group disbanded in 1981, he was asked to join another post-punk band, Maximum Joy. He was also involved in the short-lived German electro outfit U-BahnX with Disc O'Dell. Waddington has been absent from past Pop Group reunions and his last performance credit was on Lily Allen's 2006 album Alright, Still.

Discography

Studio albums

Guest appearances

References
General

 
 

Notes

Living people
Musicians from Bristol
English rock guitarists
English male guitarists
British post-punk musicians
The Pop Group members
Year of birth missing (living people)